Serbian cuisine is a Balkan cuisine that consists of the culinary methods and traditions of Serbia. Its roots lie in Serbian history, including centuries of cultural contact and influence with the Greeks and the Byzantine Empire, the Ottomans, and Serbia's Balkan neighbours, especially during the existence of Yugoslavia. Historically, Serbian food develops from pastoral customs that involved the keeping of sheep in mountain highlands, in a climate and regional context that favoured animal husbandry over vegetable farming; Serbian food is therefore traditionally richer in animal products and basic grains - corn, wheat and oats, than fresh vegetable dishes. Following the abandon of widely practiced pastoral lifestyles, Serbian food emerges through the middle ages heavily dependant not on lamb or mutton, but on the keeping of pigs for the annual cull and the production of various cured meats - sausages, bacon and ham products. 

The Serbian government has passed laws banning the production and import of genetically modified foods, a legislative decision which has been applauded by environmentalists but caused a long-running dispute with the World Trade Organization, preventing Serbia from being able to join the WTO.

Overview

National dishes of Serbia include sarma (a mix of ground pork or beef with rice rolled in leaves of cabbage), gibanica (an egg and cheese pie made with filo dough), pljeskavica (a ground beef or pork patty), ćevapi (grilled meat), paprikaš (a soup made of paprika), gulaš ( soup of meat and vegetables usually seasoned with paprika and other spices) and Karađorđeva šnicla (a schnitzel). The national drink is rakia (various traditional fruit brandies). 

With Serbia being located on the crossroads between East and West, its cuisine has gathered elements from different cooking styles across the Middle East and Europe to develop its own hearty gastronomy with an intricate balance of rich meats, vegetables, breads, cheese, fresh pastries, and desserts. It has much in common with the cuisines of neighboring Balkan countries; its flavors are mild, fresh, and natural. Seasonings are usually salt, black pepper, and paprika, while ingredients are known for being fresh and high-quality. Seasonal food is an important element of Serbian cuisine, thus many dishes are strongly associated with a specific time of the year.

The average Serbian eats three meals a day: breakfast, lunch, and dinner—with lunch being the largest. However, traditionally, only lunch and dinner existed, with breakfast being introduced in the second half of the 19th century.

A number of foods which are usually bought in the West are often made at home in Serbia. These include rakija, slatko, jam, jelly, and various pickled foods—notably turšija, ajvar, or sausages. The reasons for this range from economical to cultural.  Food preparation is a strong part of the Serbian family tradition.

History

{{quotation | William, archbishop of Tyre, who visited Constantinople in 1179, described the Serbs:
<blockquote>They are rich in herds and flocks and unusually well supplied with milk, cheese, butter, meat, honey, and wax".</blockquote>}}

Krušedol monk of the Serbian Orthodox Church Jerotej, wrote the oldest  modern Serbian cookbook in 1855.

The first published cookbook in Serbia is The Big Serbian Cookbook (Велики српски кувар), written by Katarina Popović-Midzina in 1877.

The best known Serbian cookbook is Pata's Cookbook (Патин кувар), written by Spasenija Pata Marković in 1907; the book remains in publication even today.

An old Serbian legend says that during the time of the 14th-century Serbian Empire, under the rule of Stefan Uroš IV Dušan, meals in the Serbian palace were eaten with golden spoons and forks. Historians say that medieval Serbian cuisine mainly consisted of milk, dairy, produce, and vegetables. Not a lot of bread was eaten, but when it was, the rich ate bread made from wheat and the poor ate bread made from oats and rye. The only meat consumed was wild game, with cattle reserved for agricultural use.

Meals
Breakfast
Breakfast in Serbia is an early but hearty meal, rich in calories and carbohydrates, meant to provide one with an abundance of energy to start the day. Bread is frequently served with butter, jam, yogurt, sour cream, or cheese, accompanied by bacon, sausage, salami, eggs, or kajmak. Serbians often stop by a bakery in the morning for fresh pastries such as pogačice, paštete, kifle (which in Serbian usage may or may not be crescent-shaped, and may be sweet, but may also be sprinkled with salt crystals), kiflice, perece, pletenice, štapići, zemičke, djevreci, mekike, and uštipci. Other common breakfast dishes include burek, kačamak, and cicvara (types of polenta) and popara, proja (cornbread), and čalabrca. Before breakfast most people usually have a cup of kava, or espresso, and with the breakfast itself either tea, milk, milk coffee, or chocolate milk is served.

Appetizers
Meze is an assortment of small dishes and appetizers, though, unlike the Middle Eastern meze, it does not usually include cooked dishes, and is therefore more similar to Italian antipasto. A Serbian meze typically includes slices of cured meats and sausages, cheeses, olives, fresh vegetables, and zimnica. Meze is served either to accompany alcoholic drinks or as a starter before a soup on bigger meals.

Soups
Soups are eaten as an entrée at almost every lunch. They are considered to be very important for good health. There are two types of soups in Serbian cuisine: thin soups called supa, and thicker soups with roux or eggs called čorba. The most common ones are simple pottages made of beef, offal or poultry with added noodles. Lamb, veal, and fish soups are considered delicacies.

Main course
The main course is most commonly a meat dish. Besides roštilj (barbecue) which is very popular, braising, stewing, and roasting in an oven are the most common cooking methods. 

Roštilj (barbecue)
Grilling is very popular in Serbia. Grilled meats are the primary main course dishes offered in restaurants. They are commonly served as mixed grill on large oval plates. They are often also eaten as fast food. The cities of Leskovac and Novi Pazar are especially famous for their barbecue.

Bread
Bread is a staple of Serbian meals, and it is often treated almost ritually. A traditional Serbian welcoming is to offer the guest with bread and salt; bread also plays an important role in religious rituals. Many Serbs believe that it is sinful to throw away bread regardless of how old it is. Although pasta, rice, potato, and similar side dishes did enter the everyday cuisine over time, many Serbs still eat bread with meals.

In most bakeries and shops, white wheat bread loaves (typically 0.5 kg) are sold. In modern times, black bread and various graham bread variations have regained popularity. In many rural households bread is still baked in cast iron ovens, usually in bigger loaves.

Salads
In Serbia, salads are eaten as a side dish with the main course. The simplest of salads consist of sliced lettuce, cabbage, tomato, cucumber or carrot, olives with oil, vinegar, salt, and spices.

Relishes

Dairy

Dairy products are an important part of the Serbian diet. Fermented products such as sour milk, kajmak, yogurt and pavlaka are common breakfast foods, consumed daily. White cheeses, called sir are much more common in Serbia than yellow cheeses. There are numerous varieties, some of which have been awarded for their quality, such as the white cheese with walnuts from Babine, which won the 2012 "best autochtonic cheese" award. Serbian Pule cheese, made from donkey milk, is the most expensive cheese in the world. Although less common, several yellow cheese are locally produced.

 Meat products 
Traditional Serbian meat products are simple ham, bacon, dry ribs, and a kind of pork rinds called čvarci. They are usually produced every autumn or in early winter, during an event called svinjokolj, where pigs are slaughtered and meat is preserved for the winter. Cured meats, bacon, salo, čvarci, sausages such as krvavica, and kulen are produced. Offal and cheaper cuts of meat are utilized as well, and made into processed products such as švargla.

Serbian meat products—especially those which attained protected designation of origin status—include:

 Smoked ham (šunka)
 Beef or pork (užička pršuta), from Užice
 Pastrma
 Zlatibor prosciutto (zlatiborska pršuta), from Zlatibor
 Pečenica
 Salo (food)
 Užice bacon (užička slanina), from Užice
 Dry ribs
 Čvarci, pork rinds
 Duvan čvarci
 Valjevo duvan čvarci (valjevski duvan čvarci), from Valjevo

Various kinds of sausages and similar more complex meat products were created under Austrian influence in Vojvodina. They include:

 Sausage (kobasica)
 Srem sausage (sremska domaća kobasica), from Srem
 Srem salami (sremska salama), from Srem
 Požarevac sausage (požarevačka kobasica), from Požarevac
 Petrovac sausage (petrovačka kobasica), from Petrovac
 Srpska kobasica (Serbian sausage)
 Njeguški pršut 
 Kulen
 Srem kulen, from Srem
 Blood sausage (krvavice)
 Head cheese (švargla)

Pies
Pies are very popular in Serbia. They are eaten either for breakfast, dinner, or as a snack. They are most commonly made with thin layers of phyllo dough. There are several methods of preparation and numerous types of fillings, both sweet and savory. Serbian pies are usually named after either the preparation method or the filling.

One variety of pie that is not made with phyllo is the štrudla'', which, in turn, isn't similar to strudel, but rather to a nut roll.

Sweets and desserts

Sweets are served at the end of meals. Sweets and desserts enjoyed in Serbia typically include both Middle Eastern and European ones, as well as some authentically Serbian ones. Besides the ones mentioned here, pies with sweet fruit fillings are also common.

Ritual food

Drinks

Non-alcoholic

Domestic coffee (or Serbian coffee) is the most commonly consumed non-alcoholic beverage in Serbia. It is mostly prepared at home, rather than bought in coffee shops, and preferably consumed in the company of friends or family. Slatko, ratluk, and raki may be served alongside coffee. The majority of the Serbian population starts a day with a cup of coffee in the morning. Herbal teas are consumed as a medication, rather than a beverage. Yogurt and kefir are commonly consumed dairy beverages. They frequently accompany savory pastries. A beverage made from maize, called boza or kvas, was once popular, but today is rarely consumed.

A number of fruit juice and mineral water brands are produced locally. The Knjaz Milos mineral water is considered a national brand.

Alcoholic

Rakija

Rakija is a general term for distilled beverages made from fruits. There are numerous varieties, which are usually named after the type of fruit they are made from. Comparatively many people brew their own rakija. Loza, made from grapes, is considered the national drink.

Beer

Beer has become recently popular and is enjoyed in Serbia, even outpacing the traditional raki and wine. The largest brewery in the country is Apatinska pivara.

Wine

There are nearly 110,000 hectares of vineyards in Serbia, producing about 645,000 tons of grapes annually, with South Serbia producing the most. Because of that, Serbia is internationally recognized as a great wine producer.

See also
 Culture of Serbia

References

External links 

 Nigella.com – English language recipe for Vasa's Torte (traditional birthday cake with origin from Paraćin, Serbia)
 SerbiaTouristGuide.com – includes Serbian recipes

 
Balkan cuisine
Serbian culture
Articles containing video clips